The County Court is a national civil court for England and Wales with unlimited financial jurisdiction.

The County Court sits in various County Court buildings and courtrooms throughout England and Wales, and not in one single location. It is a single court in the sense of a single centrally organised and administered court system. The County Court centres the court sits in today correspond to the earlier individual county courts.

History

The history of the English county court is one of the most interesting branches of the legal history of England. The first mention of what was to become a court was the concept of a Comitatus in the time of the early Germans. According to the writings of the Roman historian Tacitus's treatise Germania (98.AD), the comitatus was a military bond between a Germanic warrior and his Lord. Later, during the Anglo Saxon period (450-1066) the Comitatus was a court of law and not an organization for military purposes.

In Anglo Saxon England, the name for court was gemot and all courts were called by this name. Later, the Shire court was an early form of representative democracy. After the Norman conquest of England in 1066, there was further development of county courts and government. All of England was divided into administrative units called shires, with subdivisions. Shires were run by officials known as shire reeves or sheriffs.

The chief business of the court was to hear civil pleas. There were numerous separate county court systems, each with jurisdiction across England and Wales for enforcement of its orders, but each with a defined "county court district" from which it took claims. County court districts did not always have the same boundaries as counties. 

The modern County Court in England and Wales was created by the County Courts Act 1846, which created a jurisdiction for small civil claims intended to be more coherent, and less cumbersome and costly, than the universal jurisdiction of the High Court or the remnants of local courts administering justice in civil matters. Whilst older local courts were, for the most part, left in place to start with, their days were numbered and section 28 of the County Courts Act 1867 gave the new court system exclusive jurisdiction over other inferior courts (i.e. other than the High Court) for most purposes. 

Further reorganisation was achieved by the Courts Act 1971. Since 2014, England and Wales have had what is officially described as "a single civil court" named the County Court, with unlimited financial jurisdiction.

Procedure

County Court matters can be lodged at a court in person, by post or via the Internet in some cases through the County Court Bulk Centre. Cases are normally heard at the court having jurisdiction over the area where the claimant lives. Most matters are decided by a district judge or circuit judge sitting alone. Civil matters in England (with minor exceptions, e.g. in some actions against the police) do not have juries. Judges in the County Court are either former barristers or former solicitors, whereas in the High Court they are more likely to have formerly been a barrister.

Small claims

Civil claims with an amount in controversy under £10,000 (the Jackson Reforms have increased this from £5,000) are dealt with in the County Court under the small claims track (sometimes known to the lay public as "small claims court," although it is not a separate court). Claims between £5,000 and £25,000 (£15,000 for cases started before April 2009) that are capable of being tried within one day are allocated to the "fast track" and claims over £25,000 (£15,000 for cases started before April 2009) to the "multi track." These 'tracks' are labels for the use of the court system – the actual cases will be heard in the County Court or the High Court depending on their value. For personal injury, defamation, and some landlord-tenant dispute cases the thresholds for each track have different values.

Appeals
Appeals are to a higher judge (a circuit judge hears district judge appeals), the High Court of Justice or to the Court of Appeal, as the case may be.

Enforcement
In debt cases, the aim of a claimant taking County Court action against a defendant is to secure a County Court judgment. This is a legal order to pay the full amount of the debt. Judgments can be enforced at the request of the claimant in a number of ways, including requesting the court bailiffs to seize goods, the proceeds of any sale being used to pay the debt, or an Attachment of Earnings Order, where the defendant's employer is ordered to make deductions from the gross wages to pay the claimant.

County Court judgments are recorded in the Register of Judgments, Orders and Fines and in the defendant's credit records held by credit reference agencies. This information is used in consumer credit scores, making it difficult or more expensive for the defendant to obtain credit. In order to avoid the record being kept for years in the register, the debt must be settled within thirty days after the date the County Court judgment was served (unless the judgment was later set aside). If the debt was not fully paid within the statutory period, the entry will remain for six full years.

References

County courts in England and Wales